Ray Fitzgerald is an American cowboy poet.

References

Living people
American male poets
Year of birth missing (living people)
Place of birth missing (living people)